Tozlu may refer to:

 Tozlu, Tufanbeyli, a village in Adana Province, Turkey
 Eren Tozlu, Turkish footballer
 Tozlu, Iran, a village in Zanjan Province, Iran